Tiyanaks is a horror thriller film directed by Mark A. Reyes and starring Rica Peralejo, Jennylyn Mercado, Mark Herras, and JC De Vera. It is the second installment of the Tiyanak film series.

Plot
A school organization heads off to a Holy Week retreat, led by their religion professor. But before long, they realize they've lost their way due to misdirection and have no choice but to stay the night in a desolate house, with only a mother Mildred (Lotlot de Leon) and her son Biboy (Nash Aguas) living in the house.

The boy has three playmates who become jealous when the boy declines to join them in play, which angers them, and they seek vengeance on the newcomers. Many nights later, the kids transform themselves into their real form tiyanaks with elemental powers of water, air, and land attack the group, killing and disabling them one by one, until only the professor, the mother and her son, and some students remain. The mother dies when a tiyanak bites her while defending her son. The students kill two of the tiyanaks with holy relics but fall short when dispatching the last of them. The professor has the idea of baptizing the tiyanaks by submersing them on the pool, killing the last one with this method.

Many days later, the survivors have a party when Sheila checks on Biboy who contracted a fever. When they try to find out what happened, the boy's eyes become fiery and enraged, and his head becomes engulfed in flames, revealing himself as a tiyanak.

Cast

Rica Peralejo as Sheila
Jennylyn Mercado as Rina
Mark Herras as Christian
JC De Vera as Kerwin
Lotlot De Leon as Mildred
TJ Trinidad as Professor Earl
Nash Aguas as Biboy
Karel Marquez as Cindy
Ryan Yllana as PJ
Jill Yulo as Hanz
Alwyn Uytingco as Bryan
Andrei Felix as Rex
Tom Olivar as Mang Gaston
Alcris Galura as Gasoline Boy
Mika Dela Cruz as Water Tiyanak
Rian Josh Conde as Land Tiyanak
Moki Torralba  as Air Tiyanak
Ana Roces as Mother of Land Tiyanak

Deaths
 Mother of Land Tiyanak (killed by Tiyanak)
 Bryan (killed by Water Tiyanak)
 Hanz (killed by Water Tiyanak)
 Mang Gaston (killed by Land Tiyanak)
 Kerwin (killed by Air Tiyanak)
 Rex (Haunted and strangled by Air Tiyanak)
 Mildred (killed by Water Tiyanak) 
 Land Tiyanak (killed by Professor Earl)
 Air Tiyanak (killed by Rina)
 Water Tiyanak (killed by Sheila)

See also
 List of ghost films

References

External links

GMA article

2007 horror films
2007 films
2000s Tagalog-language films
Philippine horror films
Regal Entertainment films
2000s English-language films
Films directed by Mark A. Reyes